Mile End is a London Underground station in Mile End, London. It is served by the Hammersmith & City, District and Central lines. This station features a cross-platform interchange in both directions, District and Hammersmith & City lines stopping on the inside tracks and the Central line stopping on the outside tracks. It is in Travelcard Zone 2.

History
The station was opened on 2 June 1902 by the Whitechapel & Bow Railway (W&BR). Electrified services started in 1905. The first services were provided by the District Railway (now the District line); the Metropolitan line followed in 1936 (In 1988 this section of the Metropolitan was renamed the Hammersmith & City line). In 1946 the station was expanded and rebuilt by the Chief Architect of London Underground, Stanley Heaps and his assistant Thomas Bilbow, as part of the Central line eastern extension, with services starting on 4 December 1946. Following nationalisation of the joint venture owners of the W&BR, full ownership of the station passed to London Underground in 1950.

During the development of the Docklands Light Railway (DLR) in the 1980s, it was to be a tram system, with the preferred northern option was to run the DLR along Mile End Road towards a terminus at Mile End tube station. However the Stratford route was picked and the system became a light metro instead.

The station has undergone renovation in 2007. Metronet, a company in a public–private partnership with Transport for London (TfL), got as far as stripping the station bare before the company collapsed in 2008. After a short changeover period, TfL continued the renovation work.

On 5 July 2007 a Central line train was derailed when it hit a roll of fire blanket, which had been blown out of a cross-passage between the two tunnels by the strong crosswinds.

In November 2009, part of a plastic barrier broke off from a departing Central line train and struck three commuters. One woman suffered a 5 cm cut in her forehead, and London Underground Ltd faced a fine of up to £20,000 after admitting liability in the case.

Design and layout

Mile End is the only station in a tunnel on the network that offers cross-platform interchange between deep tube (Central line) and sub-surface (District and Hammersmith & City line) trains. The station takes its name from the A11 Mile End Road, which itself is named after a milestone signifying the point one mile (1.6 km) east of the boundary of the City of London. However, the stone's position was actually closer to Stepney Green than Mile End station itself, which is further east, on the junction with Burdett Road.

Notable local places
The station is close to Victoria Park and Mile End Park, as well as the Regent's Canal. Queen Mary University of London, Mile End Hospital and the now-closed St. Clements Hospital—part of the Royal London Hospital—are nearby.

Connections
London Buses routes 25, 205, 277, 323, 339, 425, D6, D7 and night routes N25, N205 and N277 serve the station. There is a Public Carriage Office taxi rank on Mile End Road/Maplin Street next to the station.

Notes

References

External links

District line stations
Hammersmith & City line stations
Central line (London Underground) stations
London Underground Night Tube stations
Tube stations in the London Borough of Tower Hamlets
Former Whitechapel and Bow Railway stations
Railway stations in Great Britain opened in 1902
Stanley Heaps railway stations
Mile End